FWA  may refer to:

Places

 Fwa River, in the Congo Basin
 French West Africa, a former colony

Entertainment and recreation

 Film Writers Association
 Florida Writers Association
 Frontier Wrestling Alliance, a British wrestling promotion
 Furry Weekend Atlanta, a fandom convention
 Federation of Welsh Anglers
 Football Writers' Association
 Free Weezy Album, a 2015 album by Lil Wayne

Government and politics

 Fair Work Commission, formerly Fair Work Australia
 Federal Works Agency of the United States
 Fédération wallonne de l'agriculture, a farmers' association in Wallonia
 Free Wales Army, a defunct Welsh nationalist paramilitary organization
 Free West Alliance, an American libertarian organization

Science and technology
 Fireworks algorithm
 Fixed Wireless Access, another name for Wireless local loop
 Fluorescent whitening agent
 TheFWA, awards

Transportation

 Fort Wayne International Airport, in Indiana, United States
 Interstate Airlines, a defunct Dutch airline

Other

 Fwâi language, spoken in New Caledonia
 Financial Women's Association, in the United States